Gombyn Khishigbaatar (born 24 August 1953) is a Mongolian wrestler. He competed at the 1976 Summer Olympics and the 1980 Summer Olympics.

References

1955 births
Living people
Mongolian male sport wrestlers
Olympic wrestlers of Mongolia
Wrestlers at the 1976 Summer Olympics
Wrestlers at the 1980 Summer Olympics
Place of birth missing (living people)
20th-century Mongolian people
21st-century Mongolian people